Korovye is a rural locality (a selo) in Altynzharsky Selsoviet of Volodarsky District, Astrakhan Oblast, Russia. The population was 157 as of 2010. There is 1 street.

Geography 
Korovye is located on the Kornevaya River, 15 km south of Volodarsky (the district's administrative centre) by road. Kara-Biryuk is the nearest rural locality.

References 

Rural localities in Volodarsky District, Astrakhan Oblast